Rizo is a surname of Spanish origin. People with the surname include:

Alex Rizo (born 1968), American politician and former educator
Carlos Esplá Rizo (1895–1971), Spanish Left Republican politician and journalist
Erick Rizo (born 1991), Cuban footballer
Eustacio Rizo (born 1971), Mexican footballer
Eyatne Rizo (born 1995), Cuban handball player
Felipe Ramos Rizo (born 1963), Mexican FIFA football referee
Jorge Rizo (born 1952), Cuban water polo player
José Rizo (DJ) (born 1956), Mexican-born American disc jockey
José Rizo Castellón (1944–2019), Nicaraguan politician
Luis Fernando Rizo-Salom (1971–2013), Colombian composer of contemporary classical music
Marco Rizo (1920–1998), Cuban-born pianist, composer, and arranger
Salvador Rizo (1760–1816), Colombian botanist and painter

See also
Gustavo Rizo Airport, domestic airport serving Baracoa, Cuba
Rizzo (surname)
Rizos, a surname

Surnames of Spanish origin